Saul Msane  was a South African politician and an intellectual, a prominent member of the Wesleyan Methodist Church and a newspaper editor. He was one of the founding members of the African National Congress and served as its Secretary General from 1917 to 1924.

He died at the home of a Dr Tittlestad, at Nkandla, KwaZulu-Natal on 6 November 1919.

References

African National Congress politicians
1856 births
1919 deaths